William Whiteway (1570–1640) was an English merchant and politician who sat in the House of Commons in 1624 and 1625.

Whiteway was born at Denbury, Devon and left his home town to become an apprentice merchant. He made his first visit to  Dorchester in 1585. In 1590 he was imprisoned as a Protestant in Honfleur, France. He settled permanently in Dorchester in 1600 as a merchant and was successful in trade, especially with France. He was active in public office. In 1610 he was listed as a capital burgess under the charter. In 1624, he was elected Member of Parliament for Dorchester. He was re-elected MP for Dorchester in 1625 and was bailiff in 1626. In 1629 he was an Alderman under the new charter and was elected mayor in 1631. He was bailiff for the fourth time in 1635.   
 
Whiteway died at the age of about 70.

They had sons William and John.

References

1570 births
1640 deaths
Members of the Parliament of England for Dorchester
English MPs 1624–1625
English MPs 1625
Mayors of Dorchester, Dorset